"I'm Good (Blue)" is a song by French DJ David Guetta and American singer Bebe Rexha. It was released as a single on 26 August 2022, through What a DJ and Warner UK. The song was written by Guetta, Rexha, Kamille and Phil Plested, with production handled by Guetta and Timofey Reznikov. The song heavily samples the 1998 single "Blue (Da Ba Dee)" by Italian group Eiffel 65; as such, Eiffel 65 members Jeffrey Jey and Maurizio Lobina, as well as the original track's co-producer Massimo Gabutti, are given writing credits.

"I'm Good (Blue)" was recorded, performed and remixed several years before it went viral on TikTok in 2022. Rexha later re-recorded her vocals for the track before it was released as a single. It has topped the charts in 22 countries such as Australia, Austria, Canada, Denmark, Finland, Germany, the Netherlands, Norway, Sweden, Switzerland and the United Kingdom. It also reached the top ten in sixteen other music markets including France and the United States. The song was nominated for Best Dance/Electronic Recording at the 65th Annual Grammy Awards.

Background and release
Guetta and Rexha previously collaborated on the singles "Hey Mama" (2015), "Say My Name" (2018) and "Family" (2021), and on the tracks "Yesterday" (2015) and "Last Hurrah (Remix)" (2019), most of which achieved commercial success.

Guetta first played "I'm Good (Blue)" during his set at Ultra Music Festival 2017. However, it was not until August 2022 that a snippet of the song would go viral. By the time it was released, it had already amassed 130,000 creations and 500 million total views on TikTok.

In an interview with Rolling Stone, Rexha said that they "put the 'nostalgic remix together so naturally'".

Composition
The song was described as an "emotional club hit" which combines Rexha's "sentimental vocals" with "euphoric piano chords" and "thrilling dancefloor energy". The song heavily interpolates Eiffel 65's 1998 hit "Blue (Da Ba Dee)". It is recorded in the key of G minor.

Commercial performance
The song debuted at number 81 on the Billboard Hot 100 on the issue dated 10 September 2022. It later peaked at number four, making it Guetta's seventh and Rexha's fourth top-10 hit. It is Guetta's first top-ten entry on the Hot 100 in seven years ("Hey Mama"), and marks his highest peak on the chart.

Music video
The music video for the song, filmed in Ibiza in early September 2022 and directed by KC Locke, was released on 20 September. In some scenes, Rexha can be seen wearing a blue latex catsuit.

In popular media
The song was used to promote "Raw Is XXX", the January 23rd, 2023 edition of WWE Monday Night Raw celebrating the 30th anniversary of the program. WWE later released the full promo package featuring the song on their YouTube channel. 

The song was later sung by Rexha at the 2023 Kids' Choice Awards, an annual awards show held by Nickelodeon.

Awards and nominations

Track listing

Charts

Weekly charts

Monthly charts

Year-end charts

Certifications

Release history

See also
 "Some Say" – by Nea

References

2022 singles
2022 songs
Bebe Rexha songs
Canadian Hot 100 number-one singles
David Guetta songs
Dutch Top 40 number-one singles
Number-one singles in Australia
Number-one singles in Austria
Number-one singles in Denmark
Number-one singles in Finland
Number-one singles in Germany
Number-one singles in Greece
Number-one singles in the Netherlands
Number-one singles in Norway
Number-one singles in Poland
Number-one singles in Sweden
Songs written by David Guetta
Songs written by Bebe Rexha
Songs written by Maurizio Lobina
Songs written by Kamille (musician)
Ultratop 50 Singles (Flanders) number-one singles
Ultratop 50 Singles (Wallonia) number-one singles
UK Singles Chart number-one singles
Songs about dancing
Number-one singles in France
Parlophone singles
Warner Music Group singles
Warner Records singles